Udarny (masculine), Udarnaya (feminine), or Udarnoye (neuter) is the name of several inhabited localities in Russia.

Urban localities
Udarny, Karachay-Cherkess Republic, a work settlement in Prikubansky District of the Karachay-Cherkess Republic; 

Rural localities
Udarny, Jewish Autonomous Oblast, a station in Obluchensky District of the Jewish Autonomous Oblast
Udarny, Krasnodar Krai, a khutor in Staroderevyankovsky Rural Okrug of Kanevskoy District in Krasnodar Krai; 
Udarny, Republic of Mordovia, a settlement in Lepleysky Selsoviet of Zubovo-Polyansky District in the Republic of Mordovia; 
Udarny, Omsk Oblast, a settlement in Krasnopolyansky Rural Okrug of Gorkovsky District in Omsk Oblast; 
Udarny, Orenburg Oblast, a settlement in Rubezhinsky Selsoviet of Pervomaysky District in Orenburg Oblast
Udarny, Stavropol Krai, a settlement in Prisadovy Selsoviet of Novoalexandrovsky District in Stavropol Krai
Udarnoye, Amur Oblast, a selo in Polyansky Rural Settlement of Seryshevsky District in Amur Oblast
Udarnoye, Belogorsky District, Republic of Crimea, a selo in Belogorsky District of the Republic of Crimea
Udarnoye, Dzhankoysky District, Republic of Crimea, a selo in Dzhankoysky District of the Republic of Crimea
Udarnoye, Kaliningrad Oblast, a settlement in Kaluzhsky Rural Okrug of Chernyakhovsky District in Kaliningrad Oblast
Udarnoye, Krasnodar Krai, a selo in Kiyevsky Rural Okrug of Krymsky District in Krasnodar Krai; 
Udarnoye, Primorsky Krai, a selo in Dalnerechensky District of Primorsky Krai
Udarnoye, Sakhalin Oblast, a selo under the administrative jurisdiction of the town of district significance of Shakhtyorsk in Uglegorsky District of Sakhalin Oblast